Cornell Luther Dupree (December 19, 1942 – May 8, 2011) was an American jazz and R&B guitarist. He worked at various times with Aretha Franklin, Bill Withers, Donny Hathaway, King Curtis and Steve Gadd, appeared on David Letterman, and wrote a book on soul and blues guitar, Rhythm and Blues Guitar. He reportedly recorded on 2,500 sessions.

Biography

Dupree was born and raised in Fort Worth, Texas, where he graduated from I.M. Terrell High School. He began his career playing in the studio band for Atlantic Records, recording albums by Aretha Franklin (Aretha Live at Fillmore West) and King Curtis as a member of Curtis's band The King Pins, having grown up with King Curtis in Fort Worth). He appeared on the 1969 Lena Horne and Gábor Szabó recording and on recordings with Archie Shepp, Grover Washington Jr., Snooky Young, and Miles Davis.

He was a founding member of the band Stuff with Eric Gale, Richard Tee, Steve Gadd, Chris Parker, and Gordon Edwards. Dupree and Tee recorded together on many occasions. Dupree appeared on Joe Cocker's Stingray and Luxury You Can Afford, plus Cornell's solo albums Teasin, Saturday Night Fever, Shadow Dancing, Can't Get Through, Coast to Coast, Uncle Funky, Child's Play, Bop 'n' Blues, and Unstuffed. He played on Brook Benton's "Rainy Night in Georgia" and "Please Send Me Someone to Love" and is featured on two tracks of Peter Wolf's 1998 album, Fool's Parade.

In December 1972, the British music magazine New Musical Express reported that Dupree, Roberta Flack, and Jerry Jemmott, were injured in an auto accident in Manhattan.

Yamaha produced a signature guitar called the Cornell Dupree Model.

In 1989, Cornell recorded a video for Arlen Roth called Mastering R&B Guitar, which documented his style, technique, and influences. In 2009, Dupree appeared in a documentary entitled Still Bill, which chronicled the life and times of Bill Withers. He appeared on stage playing a guitar-led version of Grandma's Hands. Withers, at first, was sitting in the audience, but ended up joining him on stage to sing the lyrics to the song. In this part of the documentary, Dupree played his guitar on a stool, breathing using an oxygen machine, which foretold his suffering from emphysema.

Dupree died on May 8, 2011 at his home in Fort Worth, Texas. He had been waiting for a lung transplant as a result of emphysema.

Discography

As leader
 Teasin (Atlantic, 1974)
 Cornell Dupree's Saturday Night Fever (Versatile, 1977)
 Shadow Dancing (Versatile, 1978)
 Coast to Coast (Antilles, 1988)
 Can't Get Through (Amazing, 1991)
 Child's Play (Amazing, 1993)
 Guitar Riffs for DJs Vol. 1 (Tuff City, 1993)
 Guitar Riffs for DJs Vol. 2 (Tuff City, 1993)
 Bop 'n' Blues (Kokopelli, 1995)
 Double Clutch (TKO Magnum Music, 1998)
 I'm Alright (Dialtone, 2011)
 Doin' Alright (P-Vine, 2011)

With Gadd Gang
 The Gadd Gang (Columbia, 1986)
 Here & Now (Columbia, 1988)
 Live at the Bottom Line (A Touch, 1994)

With Rainbow
 Crystal Green (East Wind, 1978)
 Over Crystal Green (Eighty-Eights, 2002)
 Harmony (Eighty-Eights, 2003)

With Stuff
 Stuff (Warner Bros., 1976)
 More Stuff (Warner Bros., 1977)
 Live Stuff (Warner Bros., 1978)
 Stuff It (Warner Bros., 1979)
 Live in New York (Warner Bros., 1980)
 Made in America (Bridge Gate, 1994)
 Now (Skip, 2001)
 Live at Montreax 1976 (Eagle, 2008)

As sideman
With Joe Cocker
 I Can Stand a Little Rain (A&M, 1974)
 Jamaica Say You Will (A&M, 1975)
 Stingray (A&M, 1976)
 Luxury You Can Afford (Asylum, 1978)

With Hank Crawford
 It's a Funky Thing to Do (Cotillion, 1971)
 Help Me Make it Through the Night (Kudu, 1972)
 We Got a Good Thing Going (Kudu, 1972)
 Crunch Time (Milestone, 1999)

With Aretha Franklin
 Spirit in the Dark (Atlantic, 1970)
 Young, Gifted and Black (Atlantic, 1972)
 Let Me in Your Life (Atlantic, 1974)
 With Everything I Feel in Me (Atlantic, 1974)
 La Diva (Atlantic, 1979)
 Aretha (Arista, 1980)

With Donny Hathaway
 Donny Hathaway  (Atco, 1971)
 Extension of a Man (Atco, 1973)

With The Joneses
 Keepin' Up with the Joneses (Mercury, 1974)
 Our Love Song (P-Vine, 1992)
 Come Back to Me (P-Vine, 1993)

With Margie Joseph
 Margie Joseph (Atlantic, 1973)
 Sweet Surrender (Atlantic, 1974)
 Margie (Atlantic, 1975)

With King Curtis 
 Live at Small's Paradise (Atco, 1966)
 Get Ready (Atco, 1970)
 Live at Fillmore West (Atco, 1971)
 Everybody's Talkin'  (Atco, 1972)
 Blues at Montreux (Atlantic, 1973)

With Roland Kirk
 Blacknuss (Atlantic, 1972)
 The Case of the 3 Sided Dream in Audio Color (Atlantic, 1975)
 Kirkatron (Warner Bros., 1977)

With Van McCoy
 And His Magnificent Movie Machine (H&L, 1977)
 My Favorite (MCA, 1978)
 Lonely Dancer (MCA, 1979)

With Geoff Muldaur
 Is Having a Wonderful Time (Reprise Records, 1975)

With David "Fathead" Newman
 Lonely Avenue (Atlantic, 1972)
 The Weapon (Atlantic, 1973)
 Scratch My Back (Prestige, 1979)
 Return to the Wide Open Spaces (Amazing, 1990)

With Esther Phillips
 Burnin (Atlantic, 1970)
 From a Whisper to a Scream (Kudu, 1971)
 Alone Again Naturally (Kudu, 1972)With Wilson Pickett In the Midnight Hour (Atlantic, 1965)With Lou Rawls Shades of Blue (Philadelphia International, 1980)
 At Last (Blue Note, 1989)
 It's Supposed to Be Fun (Blue Note, 1990)
 Portrait of the Blues (Manhattan, 1993)With Archie Shepp Attica Blues (Impulse, 1972)
 The Cry of My People (Impulse, 1973)
 The Impulse Story (Impulse!, 2006)With Stanley Turrentine Cherry (CTI, 1972)
 The Man with the Sad Face (Fantasy, 1976)
 Nightwings (Fantasy, 1977)
 West Side Highway (Fantasy, 1978)With Zulema Zulema (Sussex, 1972)
 R.S.V.P. (RCA Victor, 1975)
 Z-licious (London, 1978)With others'''
 Ashford & Simpson, I Wanna Be Selfish (Warner Bros., 1974)
 Average White Band, Warmer (Atlantic, 1978)
 Burt Bacharach, Blue Note Plays Burt Bacharach (Blue Note, 2004)
 Bama, Ghettos of the Mind (Chess, 1972)
 Joe Bataan, Singin' Some Soul (Fania, 1969)
 Joe Bataan, Afrofilipino (Salsoul, 1975)
 Harold Battiste & Melvin Lastie, Hal-Mel Alone Together (Opus 43, 1976)
 Maggie Bell, Queen of the Night (Atlantic, 1974)
 Brook Benton, Brook Benton Today (Cotillion, 1970)
 Brook Benton, Story Teller (Cotillion, 1971)
 Jay Berliner, Bananas Are Not Created Equal (Mainstream, 1972)
 Carla Bley, Dinner Music (WATT Works, 1977)
 Oscar Brown Jr., Movin' On (Atlantic, 1972)
 Mariah Carey, Emotions (Columbia, 1991)
 Alice Clark, Alice Clark (Mainstream, 2019)
 Billy Cobham, Total Eclipse (Atlantic, 1974)
 The Crusaders, Ghetto Blaster (MCA, 1984)
 Miles Davis, Get Up with It (Columbia, 1974)
 Rainy Davis, Ouch (Columbia, 1988)
 Jackie DeShannon, Your Baby Is a Lady (Atlantic, 1974)
 Lou Donaldson, Sweet Lou (Blue Note, 1974)
 Charles Earland, The Dynamite Brothers (Prestige, 1974)
 Pee Wee Ellis, Home in the Country (Savoy, 1977)
 Faith Hope and Charity, Faith Hope & Charity (20th Century Fox, 1978)
 Michael Franks, The Camera Never Lies (Warner Bros., 1987)
 Jun Fukamachi, Evening Star (Kitty, 1978)
 Hiroshi Fukumura, Hunt Up Wind (Flying Disk, 1978)
 Dizzy Gillespie, Sweet Soul (Gateway, 1977)
 Grant Green, Blue Breakbeats (Blue Note, 1998)
 Grant Green, The Final Comedown (Blue Note, 2003)
 Eddie Harris, Come on Down (Atlantic, 1970)
 Eddie Harris, Second Movement (Atlantic, 1971)
 Gene Harris, Gene Harris of the Three Sounds (Blue Note, 1972)
 Loleatta Holloway, Queen of the Night (Gold Mind, 1978)
 Richard Groove Holmes, I'm in the Mood for Love (Flying Dutchman, 1976)
 Takehiro Honda, It's Great Outside (Flying Disk, 1978)
 Lena Horne & Gabor Szabo, Lena & Gabor (Skye, 1970)
 Lena Horne & Michel Legrand, Lena & Michel (RCA Victor, 1975)
 Cissy Houston, Cissy Houston  (Private Stock, 1977)
 Weldon Irvine, Cosmic Vortex (RCA Victor, 1974)
 Weldon Irvine, Sinbad (RCA Victor, 1976)
 Etta James, Deep in the Night (Warner Bros., 1978)
 Jobriath, Creatures of the Street (Elektra, 1974)
 Elvin Jones, At This Point in Time (Blue Note, 1998)
 Elvin Jones, The Prime Element (Blue Note, 1976)
 Salena Jones, My Love (JVC, 1981)
 Kimiko Kasai, This Is My Love (CBS, 1975)
 Robin Kenyatta, Take the Heat Off Me (Jazz Dance, 1979)
 Chaka Khan, Chaka (Warner Bros., 1978)
 B.B. King, Guess Who (ABC, 1972)
 Freddie King, My Feeling for the Blues (Atlantic, 1970)
 Gladys Knight & the Pips, Still Together (Buddah, 1977)
 Gladys Knight & the Pips, The One and Only (Buddah, 1978)
 Yusef Lateef, Hush 'N' Thunder (Atlantic, 1973)
 Webster Lewis, On the Town (Epic, 1976)
 Lulu, New Routes (Atco, 1970)
 Cheryl Lynn, In Love (Columbia, 1979)
 Herbie Mann, Push Push (Embryo, 1971)
 Herbie Mann, Deep Pocket (Kokopelli, 1992)
 Arif Mardin, Journey (Atlantic, 1974)
 John Mayall, Bottom Line (DJM, 1979)
 Les McCann, Invitation to Openness (Atlantic, 1972)
 Delbert McClinton, Never Been Rocked Enough (Curb, 1992)
 Carmen McRae, I'm Coming Home Again (Buddah, 1980)
 Jack McDuff, A Change Is Gonna Come (Atlantic, 1966)
 Jack McDuff, Magnetic Feel (Cadet, 1975)
 Jimmy McGriff, The Dudes Doin' Business (Capitol, 1970)
 Bette Midler, Bette Midler (Atlantic, 1973)
 Garnet Mimms, Has It All (Arista, 1978)
 Blue Mitchell, Booty (Mainstream, 1974)
 Jackie Moore, Sweet Charlie Babe (Atlantic, 1973)
 Geoff Muldaur, Is Having a Wonderful Time (Reprise, 1975)
 John Kaizan Neptune, West of Somewhere (Milestone, 1981)
 Laura Nyro, Christmas and the Beads of Sweat (Columbia, 1970)
 Robert Palmer, Sneakin' Sally Through the Alley (Island, 1975)
 Eddie Palmieri, Harlem River Drive (Roulette, 1971)
 Errol Parker, My Own Bag No. 1 (Sahara, 1972)
 Johnny Pate, Outrageous (MGM, 1970)
 The Persuaders, It's All About Love (Calla, 1976)
 Seldon Powell, Messin' With (Encounter 1973)
 Bernard Purdie, Stand By Me (Whatcha See Is Whatcha Get) (Mega, 1971)
 Bernard Purdie, Soul Is... Pretty Purdie (Flying Dutchman, 1972)
 Chuck Rainey, The Chuck Rainey Coalition (Skye, 1972)
 Louie Ramirez, A Different Shade of Black (Cotique, 1976)
 Vivian Reed, Another Side (Liberty, 1978)
 Buddy Rich, Big Band Machine (Groove Merchant, 1975)
 Buddy Rich, Ease On Down the Road (Denon, 1987)
 Larry Ridley, Sum of the Parts (Strata-East, 1975)
 Lightnin' Rod, Hustlers Convention (Celluloid, 1973)
 David Ruffin, In My Stride (Motown, 1977)
 David Sanborn, Upfront (Elektra, 1992)
 Harvey Scales, Confidential Affair (Casablanca, 1978)
 Warren Schatz, Warren Schatz (Columbia, 1971)
 Marlena Shaw, Marlena (Blue Note, 1972)
 Marlena Shaw, From the Depths of My Soul (Blue Note, 1973)
 Janis Siegel, At Home (Atlantic, 1987)
 Carly Simon, Boys in the Trees (Elektra, 1978)
 Paul Simon, There Goes Rhymin' Simon (Columbia, 1973)
 The Spinners, Love Trippin' (Atlantic, 1980)
 Ringo Starr, Ringo the 4th (Atlantic, 1977)
 Candi Staton, Chance (Warner Bros., 1979)
 Dakota Staton, Madame Foo-Foo (Groove Merchant, 1972)
 Sonny Stitt, Mr. Bojangles (Cadet, 1973)
 Barbra Streisand, Guilty (Columbia, 1980)
 Kate Taylor, Kate Taylor (Columbia, 1978)
 Leon Thomas, Gold Sunrise on Magic Mountain (Mega, 1971)
 Leon Thomas, Blues and the Soulful Truth (Flying Dutchman, 1972)
 Rufus Thomas, Did You Heard Me? (Stax, 1972)
 Rufus Thomas, Crown Prince of Dance (Stax, 1973)
 Tasha Thomas, Midnight Rendezvous (SoulMusic, 2015)
 Big Mama Thornton, Sassy Mama! (Vanguard, 1975)
 Kenny Vance, Vance 32 (Atlantic, 1975)
 Eddie "Cleanhead" Vinson, You Can't Make Love Alone (Mega, 1971)
 Voices of East Harlem, Right On Be Free (Elektra, 1970)
 Cedar Walton, Beyond Mobius (RCA Victor, 1976)
 Grover Washington Jr., All the King's Horses (Kudu, 1972)
 Charles Williams, Trees and Grass and Things (Mainstream, 1971)
 Charles Williams, Stickball (Mainstream, 1972)
 Jimmy Witherspoon, Spoonful (Blue Note, 1975)
 Peter Wolf, Sleepless (Artemis, 2002)
 Philippe Wynne, Starting All Over (Cotillion, 1977)
 Camille Yarbrough, The Iron Pot Cooker'' (Vanguard, 1975)

References

External links
obituary in Gibson.com

1942 births
2011 deaths
African-American guitarists
American jazz guitarists
American session musicians
American rhythm and blues guitarists
American soul guitarists
American male guitarists
Soul-jazz guitarists
People from Fort Worth, Texas
Guitarists from Texas
20th-century American guitarists
Jazz musicians from Texas
20th-century American male musicians
American male jazz musicians
Stuff (band) members
20th-century African-American musicians
21st-century African-American people